"December Bride" is the eleventh episode of the eighth season of the situation comedy television series Roseanne. The episode revolves around the wedding of popular recurring character Leon Carp and his boyfriend Scott. It was written by William Lucas Walker and directed by Gail Mancuso. The episode originally aired on ABC on December 12, 1995, and was one of the first times an American television series had depicted the same-sex wedding of a recurring character.

Plot
Roseanne meets Scott (Fred Willard) at her diner and learns he will be marrying Leon (Martin Mull) at the end of the week and that Leon had left him at the altar five years earlier. Because they have to be out of town for pre-wedding counseling, Roseanne volunteers to plan the wedding for free.

Leon arrives at the wedding venue and is appalled at Roseanne's decor, which includes drag queens, male strippers and enormous pink triangles. He attempts to flee and goes so far as to claim he isn't really gay since he hates shopping, he's insensitive, he detests Barbra Streisand and he's a Republican. Roseanne counters by asking, "But do you like having sex with men? GAY!" In a last desperate effort, he kisses Roseanne. He confirms that he is gay and goes forward with the wedding. With the drag queens and strippers toned down, Leon and Scott exchange their vows.

Cameos
Mariel Hemingway reprised her role as Sharon, the woman who kissed Roseanne in the 1994 episode "Don't Ask, Don't Tell". When Roseanne's husband Dan (John Goodman) is distressed when the grooms kiss (off-screen), Roseanne chides him for making a fuss about two people of the same sex kissing and Sharon sits down behind her. Her appearance serves as a callback to the earlier episode and the controversy that surrounded it.

"December Bride" also features cameos by Christopher Morley, Alexis Arquette, David Michaels and June Lockhart as Leon's mom.  Milton Berle famously appeared in drag in the final scene of the episode to catch the bridal bouquet.

Controversy
ABC moved "December Bride" from its regularly scheduled broadcast time of 8:00 PM EST to 9:30 PM. An ABC spokesperson stated that this was not because of the inclusion of a same-sex wedding but because "the adult humor in this episode was more appropriate for the later time period".

Spin-off
Roseanne Barr proposed spinning off Leon and Scott into their own series, which she would co-create with "December Bride" writer William Lucas Walker. In the spinoff, Leon and Scott were to be raising a teenage daughter fathered by Leon years before. Barr suggested Don Knotts and RuPaul could play an inter-racial, inter-generational neighbor couple. Walker and Barr submitted a treatment, but ABC did not accept the series, reportedly because the network believed that a series with a gay couple as the central characters could not be sustained.

Notes

References
 Capsuto, Steven (2000). Alternate Channels: The Uncensored Story of Gay and Lesbian Images on Radio and Television. Ballantine Books. .

External links
 December Bride at Internet Movie Database

1995 American television episodes
American LGBT-related television episodes
Roseanne episodes
Television episodes about same-sex weddings